The 2021–22 season was Al-Taawoun's 66th year in their history and 12th consecutive season in the Pro League. The club participated in the Pro League, the King Cup, and the AFC Champions League.

The season covered the period from 1 July 2021 to 30 June 2022.

Players

Squad information

Transfers and loans

Transfers in

Loans in

Transfers out

Loans out

Pre-season

Competitions

Overview

Goalscorers

Last Updated: 27 June 2022

Assists

Last Updated: 27 June 2022

Clean sheets

Last Updated: 29 May 2022

References

Al-Taawoun FC seasons
Taawoun